Strombocactus disciformis is a rare species of cacti and the only species of the genus Strombocactus. The plant originates from Central and Northeast Mexico.

Description
Strombocactus is a monotypic genus with a strong turnip-like root, a small, depressed, roughly spherical stem covered with spirally arranged overlapping tubercles, each with a spine-bearing areole at its tip. Flowers come from new growth at the crown, and the cactus's small seeds are difficult to see with the naked eye.

Taxonomy
The species has several forms and subspecies:
Strombocactus disciformis f. cristata
Strombocactus disciformis ssp. esperanzae

Conservation status
Both subspecies are classified as Vulnerable on the IUCN Red List, which states that it has a limited range and "is experiencing a decline in mature individuals due to illegal overcollection". The species is listed in Appendix 1 of the Convention on International Trade in Endangered Species meaning commercial international trade is prohibited and non-commercial international trade is regulated.

References 

Cactoideae
Monotypic Cactaceae genera
Flora of Mexico